Alisdair McLaren (born 1979) is an Australian bagpiper. He is currently the Pipe Major of the Grade 1 Western Australia Police Pipe Band, the Pipes and Drums of the Royal Edindurgh Military Tattoo the former Pipe Major of the Grade One Glasgow Police Pipe Band, and the former director of The National Youth Pipe Band of Scotland. After moving to Scotland from Kalamunda, Australia, in 2007 became a member of the National Piping Centre in Glasgow and in 2011 became the first West-Australian to ever win the World Pipe Band Championships as part of the Field Marshal Montgomery Pipe Band.

Prior to his move to Scotland, McLaren attended Trinity College and was pipe major of Trinity College Pipes and Drums until 1997 when he joined the WA Police Pipe Band for 10 years.

In late 2019, Alastair was appointed Pipe Major of the Glasgow Police Pipe Band. After a few months, in January 2020, McLaren resigned from the post in order to return to his native Australia. This meant he also resigned from his position as director of the National Youth Pipe Band of Scotland.

In May 2020 he was appointed Pipe Major of the Western Australia Police Pipe Band. He resigned in 2022.

References

1979 births
Living people
Australian emigrants to Scotland
Great Highland bagpipe players
Musicians from Western Australia
People educated at Trinity College, Perth